Fredrik Stjernvall  (30 September 1845 in Tenala – 26 January 1916) was a Finnish politician. He was a member of the Senate of Finland.

1845 births
1916 deaths
People from Raseborg
Swedish-speaking Finns
Finnish senators
Members of the Diet of Finland